The Silent World of Nicholas Quinn is a crime novel by Colin Dexter, the third novel in Inspector Morse series.

Synopsis

The Oxford Foreign Examinations Syndicate runs school exams in the Persian Gulf and other places with a British connection. The Secretary Dr Bartlett and Mr Roope, a chemistry don and a member of the committee, disagree about the appointment of a new member of staff. Roope gets his way and Nicholas Quinn, a deaf man who lipreads, gets the job.

When Quinn is found murdered in his maisonette, all the staff are under suspicion.  There is Bartlett, his deputy Ogleby and the attractive Monica Height, who has liaisons with some of the others - especially young Donald Martin. Strangely, nearly all of them, including Quinn, appear to have tickets for The Nymphomaniac at Studio 2 in Walton Street on the afternoon of the murder. When later Ogleby is himself found murdered, a neat drawing of Quinn’s ticket is found in his diary.

Morse tries to deduce which of the others is the murderer but keeps getting it wrong. An intrigue involving wealthy Arabs and prior knowledge of exam papers is clearly the cause, and Quinn had found out about it and paid for it with his life.

Characters
Inspector Morse 
Sergeant Robert Lewis 
Monica Height 
Philip Ogleby 
Dr Bartlett 
Dr Roope 
Chief Superintendent Strange 
Donald Martin 
Sergeant Dixon 
Nicholas Quinn

Publication history
1977, London: Macmillan , Pub date 5 May 1977, Hardback

Adaptations
Television
The novel was adapted as the second episode of the Inspector Morse TV series in 1987. The adaptation remained faithful to the source material, the only noticeable changes being the omission of much of the material prior to Quinn's murder. The television version begins with him already employed by the syndicate. The film watched by the characters viewed was changed to Last Tango in Paris.

The cast included John Thaw as Inspector Endeavour Morse, Kevin Whately as Sergeant Robert Lewis, Barbara Flynn as Monica Height, Michael Gough as Philip Ogleby, Clive Swift as Dr Bartlett, Anthony Smee as Dr Roope, Roger Lloyd-Pack as Donald Martin, Lyndam Gregory as Sergeant Dixon, Phil Nice as Nicholas Quinn.

Radio play
In 1996, a BBC Radio 4 adaptation was released that was dramatised by Guy Meredith and directed by Ned Chaillet. The cast included John Shrapnel as Inspector  Morse, Robert Glenister as Sergeant Robert Lewis, Meg Davies as Monica Height, David Timson as Philip Ogleby, Richard Pasco as Dr Bartlett, John Hartley as Dr Roope, Stephen Critchlow as Donald Martin, Lyndam Gregory as Sergeant Dixon and Roger May as Nicholas Quinn.

References

Further reading
 Bishop, David, The Complete Inspector Morse: From the Original Novels to the TV Series London: Reynolds & Hearn (2006)  
 Bird, Christopher, The World of Inspector Morse: A Complete A-Z Reference for the Morse Enthusiast Foreword by Colin Dexter, London: Boxtree (1998) 

1977 British novels
Novels by Colin Dexter
1987 British television episodes
British novels adapted into television shows
Macmillan Publishers books